Gomasta may refer to:

Bangladesh
Gomasta, Bangladesh
Gomastapur, a village in Chapai Nawabganj District
Gomastapur Upazila, an subdistrict of Chapai Nawabganj District

India
Gomastha, an Indian agent of the British East India Company